eLAC in international relations, is an intergovernmental strategy that conceives of information and communications technologies (ICTs) as instruments for economic development and social inclusion in Latin America and the Caribbean. It is based on a public-private sector partnership and is part of a long-term vision (until 2015) in line with the Millennium Development Goals (MDGs), those of the World Summit on the Information Society (WSIS), and now, the Sustainable Development Goals (SDGs). It contributes to the implementation of these long-term goals by pursuing a consecutive series of frequently adjusted short-term action plans with concrete qualitative and quantitative goals to be achieved.

Strategy for the Information Society in Latin America and the Caribbean
The governments of Latin America and the Caribbean have asked the United Nations Economic Commission for Latin America and the Caribbean (UNECLAC) to assist them with the international private-public sector follow up of the plan.

Aims of the eLAC Action Plans
 Act as a "metaplatform" for public-private action in order to coordinate the efforts of various sectors, with an end to generating synergies, avoiding the duplication of efforts, and strengthen regional projects, by means of cooperation and the exchange of best practices at a regional level.
 Forge national strategies and initiatives in specific areas, establishing lines of action and defining indicators that illustrate the state of progress in the development of the information society.
 Deepen knowledge on critical issues in order to support the definition, design, implementation and evaluation of policies.
 Intermediate between the needs of the region's countries and the rhythm of global development, considering regional particularities within the context of the goals of the global community.

History
Five consecutive plans have already been worked on to implement this vision:
2005–2007: eLAC2007 with 30 goals and 70 activities for the years 2005–2007
2008–2010: eLAC2010 with 83 goals to be achieved during the 2008–2010 period
2010–2015: eLAC2015 with 24 goals to be achieved during the period 2010–2015
2015-2018: eLAC2018 with 23 goals to be achieved during the period 2015-2018
2018-2020: eLAC2020 with 7 broad goals to be achieved during the period 2018-2020

Political background
The eLAC Regional Action Plan is the outcome of an ongoing political process.

In 1999, the Economic and Social Council of the United Nations (ECOSOC) dedicated a series of high-level substantive meetings for their 2000 Period of Sessions to the theme "Development and international cooperation in the 21st century: the role of information technology in the context of a global knowledge-based economy." In response, the countries of Latin America and the Caribbean, convened by the Government of Brazil and ECLAC in July 2000, signed the Florianopolis Declaration, which focused on the use of information and communications technologies (ICTs) for development.

In this initial phase, the region's leaders recognized the importance of adopting proactive public policies to strengthen insertion in the information society and to adequately confront the digital divide, upon declaring: "that allowing the evolution of the information and knowledge-based society to be guided solely by market mechanisms entails the risk of an amplification of the social gaps existing within our societies, the creation of new modes of exclusion, an increase in the negative aspects of globalization and a widening of the distances between developed and developing countries".

As part of the international process of the World Summit on the Information Society, which took place in two phases (Geneva in 2003 and Tunis in 2005), officials from the countries of Latin America and the Caribbean intensified their efforts to create a regional perspective on the development of information societies. Various meetings held between 2001 and 2003 by the regional network of the United Nations' Working Group on Information and Communications Technologies emphasized the importance of collaboration between stakeholders interested in confronting this challenge. Moreover, the Agenda for Connectivity in the Americas and Quito Plan of Action (August 2002) insisted on the need to design realistic national strategies and action plans.

The Bávaro Declaration (January 2003) was an important step in the establishment of the fundamental principles for Latin America and the Caribbean in their transition towards information societies, given that they helped to identify the main characteristics of this phenomenon in the region. The repercussions of this document are noteworthy; in effect, since its approval, the analysis of Internet governance and open-source software were officially incorporated in the CMSI process for the first time, as issues that have come to take on great importance during this meeting and subsequent events.

In the preparatory meetings for the second phase of WSIS, which took place in Quito in May 2005 and during the Regional Ministerial Conference for Latin America and the Caribbean in Rio de Janeiro in June 2005, many years of dialogue on the relationship between ICTs, economic growth and equity culminated in the Rio de Janeiro Commitment, which comprises the Action Plan for the Information Society in Latin America and the Caribbean, known as eLAC2007.

The region has taken as its long-term strategic guide the Geneva Declaration of Principles and Plan of Action adopted at the World Summit on the Information Society, which lays down targets to be met by 2015, together with the United Nations' Millennium Development Goals. Building on the existing political consensus in the region, the governments of the countries comprising it put forward proposals at the meetings of the Preparatory Committee for the second phase of the Preparatory Committee for the second phase of the World Summit on the Information Society for the development of an Action Plan for Latin America and the Caribbean for the 2005–2007 period (eLAC2007), intending that this should be the first step along the road to 2015.

The second step was forged with the approval of the second Regional Action Plan (eLAC2010), which is embodied in the San Salvador Commitment, approved during the II Ministerial Conference on the Information Society, held in El Salvador, 6–8 February 2008.

The most recent Digital Agenda for Latin America and the Caribbean has been approved in Cartagena, Colombia, May 2018. eLAC2020 is clearly aligned with the Sustainable Development Goals of the United Nations, and therefore expands its role in translating global ambitions into regional (which it had previous done for the Millennium Development Goals).

Impact evaluation and monitoring
One important and special character of the eLAC Action Plans is that it counts with a continuous process of evidence-based monitoring. This provides policy makers with statistical evidence to evaluate the impact and progress. UN ECLAC (as the technical secretariat of eLAC has been providing this service by providing accountability through the tracking of policy goals through hundreds of graphs and tables:

 2005: Benchmarking WSIS in LAC
 2005: Situating eLAC2007
 2007: Monitoring eLAC2007
 2010: Monitoring eLAC2010
 2013: Monitoring eLAC2015
 2018: Monitoring eLAC2018

There were two main structural innovation in the original eLAC2007 Action Plan that distinguished it from other similar initiatives.
 It exclusively had two kinds of goals: either objectively quantifiable (in absolute or relative numbers), or action-oriented (with clearly outlined next steps). This best practice that made assessment very straightforward.
 It explicitly acted as a "metaplatform for public-private sector cooperation". Even so, there were cash-loaded development projects in the region at the time, eLAC never had the ambition to create projects of its own, but rather to contribute with a coordination role among hands-on projects. For example, the regional e-Government Network (RedGeALC) led goal 15, the regional Cooperation of Advanced Networks (RedCLARA) figured in goal 10, and the regional Observatory for the Information Society (OSILAC) drove goal 26.

See also
Delphi method
Development communication

References

Information and communication technologies for development
Action plans
Latin America and the Caribbean